William Beaton may refer to:
 William S. Beaton (1896–1956), mayor of Sudbury, Ontario
 Bill Beaton (born 1935), Scottish footballer
 William Betoun, or Beaton (died 1620), Scottish embroiderer